The espresso martini, also known as a vodka espresso, is a cold caffeinated alcoholic drink made with espresso, coffee liqueur, and vodka. It is not a true martini as it contains neither gin nor vermouth, but is one of many  drinks that incorporate the term martini into their names.

Origin
There are several claims for the origin of the espresso martini. One of the more common claims is that it was created by Dick Bradsell in the late 1980s while at Fred's Club in London for a young lady who asked for something that would "Wake me up, and then fuck me up." Bradsell has made this claim in a widely-circulated video. Bradsell has also been quoted about the circumstances of his invention of the drink, "The coffee machine at the Soho Brasseries was right next to the station where I served drinks. It was a nightmare, as there were coffee grounds everywhere, so coffee was very much on my mind. And it was all about vodka back then – it was all people were drinking."

The recipes for an espresso martini vary depending on the source. Traditionally, they include Kahlúa or Tia Maria.

Difford's Guide
The ingredients are poured into a shaker filled with ice. The mixture is then shaken, fine strained and poured into a chilled martini glass. The drink is garnished with coffee beans (and perhaps a twist of lemon zest) and served.

Popularity
The drink had a surge in popularity in the early 2020s. This popularity was met with apprehension by bartenders due to the time and effort required to prepare the drink.

References

External links

 

Cocktails with vodka
Cocktails with coffee liqueur
Alcoholic coffee drinks
Mixed drinks